State Road 250 (NM 250) is a  state highway in the US state of New Mexico. NM 250's southern terminus is at Interstate 25 Business (I-25 Bus.), Interstate 25 (I-25) and U.S. Route 85 (US 85) in Las Vegas, and the northern terminus is at the Las Vegas Municipal Airport.

Major intersections

See also

References

250
Transportation in San Miguel County, New Mexico
Las Vegas, New Mexico